Papua Island is a small circular island lying 4 nautical miles (7 km) west of Boreal Point, off the north coast of Joinville Island. The name was applied by the Argentine Antarctic Expedition (1953–54) because large numbers of gentoo penguins (Pygoscelis papua) were sighted on this island.

See also 
 List of Antarctic and sub-Antarctic islands

Islands of the Joinville Island group